Otto Krueger may refer to:

 Otto Krueger (politician) (1890–1963), North Dakota politician
 Otto Krueger (baseball) (1876–1961), Major League Baseball player
 Otto Krueger (general) (1891–1976), Luftwaffe general

See also
 Otto Kruger (1885–1974), American actor